Intxaurrondo is the name of two distinct railway stations in San Sebastián, Spain.

Intxaurrondo station (Euskotren)